Dixie Jean Woods Allen (née Woods; January 27, 1935 – March 31, 2019) was a politician from Dayton, Ohio, who served in the Ohio House of Representatives and on the Montgomery County Commission.  After the resignation of Rep. Lloyd Lewis Jr. in 1998, Allen was chosen as a political newcomer to replace him. She went on to win a full term in 1998, and was reelected in 2000.  In 2001, she opted for an appointment to the Ohio Senate, however did not obtain it.  Instead she, won reelection for a third full House term in 2002, and again in 2004.

In 2006, Republicans convinced Allen that if she would switch political parties, they would appoint her as a county commissioner.  She did so, and was appointed on July 25, 2006, after resignation from the House.  In the 2006 general election, however, Allen was defeated for a full term by Democrat Judy Dodge, and has since moved back to the Democratic Party. Allen died on March 31, 2019.

References

County commissioners in Ohio
Members of the Ohio House of Representatives
Ohio Democrats
Women state legislators in Ohio
Ohio Republicans
1935 births
2019 deaths
21st-century American politicians
21st-century American women politicians
20th-century American politicians
20th-century American women politicians